Pali Momi Medical Center is a nonprofit hospital located in Waimalu, West Oahu. It has 118 beds, and has a full range of services, including an interventional cardiac catheterization lab, CT scan and MRI services, and the state's first Retina Center. Pali Momi's emergency services division employs a team triage method, and is the only hospital in Hawaii to do so. It also has a simulation lab to further train their staff.

Pali Momi was founded in 1989 as the Kapiolani Medical Center at Pali Momi. It is an affiliate of Hawaii Pacific Health. In 2010, the hospital rebranded itself as the Pali Momi Medical Center.

See also
 Hawaii Pacific Health
 Kapiolani Medical Center for Women and Children
 Straub Clinic & Hospital
 Wilcox Memorial Hospital

References

External links 
 
 hawaiipacifichealth.org

Hospitals established in 1989
Hospitals in Hawaii
1989 establishments in Hawaii
Trauma centers